California Pacific Computer Company is a defunct software company that published games and related software for the Apple II family of computers in the late 1970s and early 1980s.  California Pacific is best known as the publisher of the first installment of Richard Garriott's popular Ultima game series, and for Super Invader, a Space Invaders clone voted the most popular software of 1978–80.

Software

 Akalabeth: World of Doom by Richard Garriott (1979)
 Apple-oids by Tom Luhrs (1980)
 Super Invader by M. Hata (1980), later renamed to Cosmos Mission 
 Bill Budge's Space Album (1980), collection of four games
 Fender Bender
 Trilogy of Games by Bill Budge (1980): Night Driver, Pinball,  Space War
 Ultima by Richard Garriott (1981)
 3-D Game Tool by Bill Budge  (1981)
 Brainteaser Boulevard by Chuck Bueche (1982), Frogger clone
 Lady Tut by Greggy (1983)

See also
Steve Gibson (computer programmer)

References

Defunct software companies of the United States
Defunct video game companies of the United States
Software companies based in California
Video game companies based in California
Companies based in Solano County, California
Davis, California
Software companies established in 1979
Software companies disestablished in 1983
Video game companies established in 1979
Video game companies disestablished in 1983
1979 establishments in California
1983 disestablishments in California